Six ships of the Royal Navy have borne the name HMS Yarmouth after the Norfolk town and port of Great Yarmouth:

  was a 50-gun ship launched in 1653 and broken up in 1680.
  was a 70-gun third rate launched in 1695. She was rebuilt in 1709, converted to a hulk in 1740 and sold in 1769.
  was a 64-gun third rate launched in 1745. She fought at Cuddalore, Negapatam and Pondicherry and later saw action in the American War of Independence.  She was refitted as a 60-gun ship in 1781, used as a receiving ship from 1783 and was broken up in 1811.
  was a lighter launched in 1798. She was rebuilt in 1810, transferred to the coastguard in 1828 and sold in 1835.
  was a  light cruiser launched in 1911 and sold in 1929.
  was a  launched in 1959 and expended as a target in 1987.

Battle honours
Ships named Yarmouth have earned the following battle honours:

Lowestoft 1665
Four Days' Battle 1666
Orfordness 1666
Sole Bay 1672
Schooneveld 1673
Texel 1673
Gibraltar 1704
Velez Malaga 1704
Marbella 1705
Finisterre 1747
Ushant 1747
Sadras 1758
Negapatam 1758
Porot Novo 1759
The Saints 1782
Jutland 1916
Falklands 1982

References
 

Royal Navy ship names